DYSI (104.9 FM), broadcasting as 104.9 Radyo Natin, is a radio station owned and operated by Manila Broadcasting Company. The station's studio is located at Kapitanes Grill, Maharlika Highway, Brgy. Obrero, Calbayog.

References

Radio stations established in 2011
Radio stations in Samar (province)